Pocklington School is a private day and boarding school in Pocklington, East Riding of Yorkshire, England. It was founded in 1514 by John Dolman. It is the 67th oldest school in the United Kingdom and celebrated its 500th birthday in 2014.

Introduction
The most common entry points are at Reception, and school Year 3 at Pocklington Prep School and 
the First Year (Year 7), Third Year (Year 9) or the Sixth Form in Pocklington School. Pupils can however be accepted for all school years subject to vacancy. All pupils are interviewed as part of the admissions process. Academic scholarships and exhibitions are offered to candidates for the First Year, Third Year and Sixth Form of Pocklington School. A limited number of Sixth Form Bursaries, worth up to 100% of the day fee, are available to Sixth Form applicants.

The current Headmaster is Mr Toby Seth, appointed in January 2019.

Pocklington School has a number of traditions, such as the year group naming convention (first year, second year, etc.). Its motto Virtute et Veritate is Latin for With courage and truth.

There are four houses: Dolman (named after the school's founder John Dolman), Gruggen and Hutton (named after former headmasters Rev. Gruggen and Rev. Hutton) and Wilberforce (named after the 18th/19th century anti-slavery campaigner William Wilberforce who attended the school).

The school has an armed forces centre, located on the edge of campus in the Annand VC Cadet Centre. The Combined Cadet Force takes part in various competitions each year and cadets can attend camps around the country.

The school sports hall is housed in the train shed of the former Pocklington railway station, designed by George Townsend Andrews.
The school runs outreach programmes engaging other schools, and working in the local community, as well as an app called Chatta to improve communication among preschool children, and has won awards for this work.

William Wilberforce
William Wilberforce was the school's most notable pupil. He attended Pocklington School from 1771–76 and is famous as the parliamentary campaigner who brought about the abolition of the slave trade and the emancipation of slaves. A statue of a freed slave sculpted by Peter Tatham (1983–93) is in the centre of the St Nicholas Quadrangle. A bronze statue of Wilberforce as a boy, by York sculptress Sally Arnup, stands near the school foyer. Dr John Sentamu unveiled the new statue in autumn 2007, which was erected in commemoration of the 200th anniversary of slave emancipation. Pocklington School appeared in a television programme entitled In Search of Wilberforce, made by former BBC news presenter Moira Stuart, and first shown on BBC 2 on 16 March 2007.

Notable former pupils

 Richard Annand, V.C., attended 1925–32, awarded the Victoria Cross in 1940 during the Battle of France. His final visit to the school was in 2002 to unveil a copy of his citation. This can be seen in the Senior School Reception entrance. The new CCF Centre, opened in 2009, is named after him.
 Scott Boswell, cricketer.
 Prof. Mark Child, FRS, attended 1947–1955, Coulson Professor of Theoretical Chemistry, Oxford.
 Sir James Cobban, attended 1920–29, educationalist, headmaster of Abingdon School, 1947–70.
 Cecil Cooper, Dean of Carlisle from 1933 to 1938.
 Martin Crimp, attended 1968–74, playwright.
 Alexandra Dariescu, attended 2002–2003, Piano soloist.
 Arthur Stuart Duncan-Jones, attended 1890–1897, Dean of Chichester for 25 years, speaker on foreign affairs and on Christian attitudes to war.
 Adrian Edmondson, attended 1969–75, co-writer/actor in Bottom and The Young Ones.
 Kyle Edmund, attended 2002–2006, tennis player.
 Stewart Eldon C.M.G., O.B.E., attended 1966–71, British Ambassador to the Republic of Ireland, Dublin.
 Christopher Elliott C.B. M.B.E., attended 1960–65, Major General, commanded the 6th Armoured Brigade, Director of Military Operations and Director General of Army Training and Recruiting.
 Andrew Farquhar C.B.E., DL, attended 1966–72, Major General, General Officer Commanding 5th Division, awarded the Legion of Merit by the U.S.A. in 2005.
 Dudley Foster, (1924–1973) – actor
 David H. French, archaeologist
 Sebastian Horsley, artist and writer.
 John How, attended 1894–1899, Bishop of Glasgow and Primus of the Church of Scotland. In the 1930s, he was Chaplain to George V, Edward VIII and later George VI.
 Ralph Ineson, actor and voice-over artist.
 Roger Kohn, designer and author.
 Richard Leonard, attended 1973–80, former leader of the Scottish Labour Party.
 Tom Loten, Yorkshire cricketer.
 Stephen Maxwell, author and politician.
 A. Michael Mennim, architect
 Lord Moran, M.C., attended 1894–99, personal physician to Winston Churchill, author of The Anatomy of Courage and The Struggle for Survival, his personal accounts of looking after Churchill.
 K. A. Pyefinch FRSE, attended 1924-1930, zoologist and expert on brown trout
 Robin Skelton, attended 1937–43, poet and literary scholar.
 Sir Tom Stoppard, O.M., C.B.E., attended 1950–54, playwright. His portrait, presented to the school by Peter Stoppard (1949–53), hangs in the senior school reception entrance.
 Frank Swindell, Archdeacon of Singapore 1916–1929.
 The Right Reverend Graham Usher, attended 1981–1989, Bishop of Norwich
 Alick Walker, attended 1936–1943, palaeontologist
 Peter Walker, C.B., C.B.E., attended 1959–68, Air Marshal, director, Joint Warfare Centre, Europe.
 Rob Webber, attended 1994–2004, England international rugby union player (hooker).
 William Wilberforce, attended 1771–1776, politician, philanthropist, and a leader of the movement to stop the slave trade. 
 Sir Dawson Williams, CBE, MD, HonLLd, DLitt, DSc, FRCP, attended 1867–1872, consultant physician and longest-serving editor of BMJ (British Medical Journal)

References

External links

Pocklington School
Old Pocklingtonians
Composer Jason Carr's website

1514 establishments in England
Church of England private schools in the Diocese of York
Member schools of the Headmasters' and Headmistresses' Conference
Educational institutions established in the 1510s
Private schools in the East Riding of Yorkshire

Pocklington